Mount Walton is a sharp, bare mountain (2,460 m) rising midway between Oona Cliff and Mount Chadwick in the Outback Nunataks. Mapped by United States Geological Survey (USGS) from surveys and U.S. Navy air photos, 1959–64. Named by Advisory Committee on Antarctic Names (US-ACAN) for Fred W. Walton, geomagnetist/seismologist at South Pole Station, 1968.

Walton, Mount
Pennell Coast